The 8th Huading Awards ceremony was held on December 10, 2012 at Shanghai.

Nominations and winners
Complete list of nominees and winners (denoted in bold).

References

2012 television awards
2012 in Chinese television
Huading Awards